USS Nedeva II (SP-64) was an armed motorboat that served in the United States Navy as a patrol vessel from 1917 until after the end of World War I.
 
Nedeva II was built as a private motorboat of the same name in 1917 by Essington Shipbuilding Company at Essington, Pennsylvania. The U.S. Navy acquired her for World War I service as a patrol vessel from her owner, J. H. H. Cromwell of Philadelphia, Pennsylvania, on 10 April 1917 and commissioned her the same day as USS Nedeva II (SP-64) with Cromwell in command.

Operating in the 4th Naval District headquartered at Philadelphia, Nedeva II patrolled in the Philadelphia area, protecting shipping in the Delaware River. After wartime service, she was decommissioned and returned to her owner.

References

NavSource Online: Section Patrol Craft Photo Archive Nedeva II (SP 64)

Patrol vessels of the United States Navy
World War I patrol vessels of the United States
Ships built in Essington, Pennsylvania
1917 ships